Over Here is a 2-part television drama made in 1996 by the BBC for BBC1 from 7 to 8 April 1996, this comedy-drama serial chronicling the lives of US Army Air Corps B-17 Flying Fortress bomber crews on a Royal Air Force Spitfire base during World War II. Samuel West starred as the RAF pilot Archie Bunting.
Martin Clunes starred as Group Captain Barker; a man who flinches at the mention of, and has an inability to say the word, "Luftwaffe".

Plot
In the early stages of their involvement in World War II a squadron of American bombers are en route to England. Due to an air raid their destination, a new base, is unavailable and they have to divert to a nearby base, RAF Lytchmere. News then reaches the inbound crews of unserviceable RADAR equipment and because of which the squadron is almost attacked by Archie Bunting. The personnel infrastructure leads to the overcrowding at RAF Lytchmere with the arrival of the Americans and various petty conflicts arise. The series is loosely based on an idea for a novel by Earnest Maxim, which was to be entitled ''Buddy & Chum'.'

Locations
Location venues for the filming were the village of Castle Acre, RAF West Raynham and RAF Sculthorpe, Wolterton Hall, and Kimberley Hall in the English county of Norfolk.

Historical accuracy
The series contains many historical inaccuracies.

References

External links
 
 
 

1996 British television series debuts
1996 British television series endings
1990s British television miniseries
Aviation television series
BBC television dramas
British comedy-drama television shows
English-language television shows
World War II television drama series
British World War II films
1990s British comedy-drama television series